Claire Cronin may refer to:

 Claire Cronin (singer-songwriter), singer-songwriter and author
 Claire Cronin (camogie), Irish camogie player
 Claire D. Cronin, US Ambassador to Ireland and former member of the Massachusetts House of Representatives